Harold Baer Sr. (1905–1987) was a long-serving New York Supreme Court justice. Baer was born in New York City, and was a member of the Class of 1923 at DeWitt Clinton High School and the New York University Law School. Baer's only child was Judge Harold Baer Jr. (1933–2014), who served on the United States District Court for the Southern District of New York.

References 

1905 births
1987 deaths
New York Supreme Court Justices
Politicians from New York City
DeWitt Clinton High School alumni
20th-century American judges
Lawyers from New York City
New York University School of Law alumni
20th-century American lawyers